Aaron Padilla may refer to:

 Aarón Padilla (footballer, born 1942), Mexican football foward
 Aaron Padilla (artist), American artist and art director
 Aarón Padilla (footballer, born 1977), Mexican football manager and former striker, son of footballer born 1942